Juan Madruñero (born 26 April 1954) is an Ecuadorian footballer. He played in three matches for the Ecuador national football team from 1979 to 1981. He was also part of Ecuador's squad for the 1979 Copa América tournament.

References

1954 births
Living people
Ecuadorian footballers
Ecuador international footballers
Association football midfielders
Sportspeople from Guayaquil